Ajike Ogunoye was a paramount ruler of Owo Kingdom, Ondo state, southwestern Nigeria who reigned between 1938 and 1941. He was the son of Olagbegi Atanneye I and immediate brother of Olowo Ajaka.

References

Yoruba monarchs
Nigerian traditional rulers
People from Owo
Olagbegi family